Hurricane Alice is the only known Atlantic hurricane to span two calendar years and one of only two named Atlantic tropical cyclones, along with Tropical Storm Zeta of 2005, to do so. The twelfth tropical cyclone and the eighth hurricane of the 1954 Atlantic hurricane season, Alice developed on December 30, 1954, from a trough of low pressure in the central Atlantic Ocean in an area of unusually favorable conditions. The storm moved southwestward and gradually strengthened to reach hurricane status. After passing through the Leeward Islands on January 2, 1955, Alice reached peak winds of  before encountering cold air and turning to the southeast. It dissipated on January 6 over the southeastern Caribbean Sea.

Alice produced heavy rainfall and moderately strong winds across several islands along its path. Saba and Anguilla were affected the most, with total damage amounting to $623,500 in 1955 USD (greater than $6,500,000 in 2022 USD). There was an earlier hurricane named Alice in the season. Operationally, lack of definitive data prevented the U.S. Weather Bureau from declaring the system a hurricane until January 2. It received the name Alice in early 1955, though re-analysis of the data supported extending its track to the previous year, resulting in two tropical cyclones of the same name in one season.

Meteorological history

A cold front moved southeastward from the East Coast of the United States on December 23, 1954, and passed over Bermuda two days later. A strong anticyclone developed behind the cold front, and on December 26 a trough extended southward from the cold front. The anticyclone moved southeastward as the trough and cold front moved eastward. The trough gradually decelerated as high pressures altered the upper level flow to that of an easterly flow. Convection increased over the trough as it moved over relatively warm waters, about 1 °C above normal, and began undergoing tropical cyclogenesis after a circulation began to develop along the northern portion of the trough.

With a narrow ridge of high pressure to its north, the depression moved west-southwestward. Atmospheric conditions were unusually favorable for the time of the year due to the ridge of high pressure preventing cold air from reaching the central Atlantic Ocean. This allowed the depression to intensify into a tropical storm later on December 30, based on direct observations. On January 1, 1955, a ship within  of the center reported hurricane-force winds and a pressure of 987 mbar. Based on this report and several other ship reports, the system was recognized as a tropical low by the San Juan Weather Bureau Office. The hurricane continued to the southwest, and entered the Caribbean Sea on January 2 after passing between Saint Martin and Saint Barthélemy. A portion of the eyewall moved over Saint Martin and Saba. Based on near-hurricane-force winds from the affected islands, an information bulletin named the system as Hurricane Alice while in the northeastern Caribbean Sea.

While near its peak the hurricane developed a ring of convection around its eye, and Alice maintained peak winds for about 24 hours until cold air from the north weakened it. Extratropical cyclogenesis occurred north of Bermuda on January 3, which weakened the high pressure system to the north of Alice and turned the flow in the Caribbean Sea to that of cold northwesterly winds. Alice turned to the southeast on January 4 and weakened to a tropical storm shortly thereafter.

Impact, naming and records

Subsequent to the confirmation of the existence of Hurricane Alice, the U.S. Weather Bureau Office in San Juan, Puerto Rico warned the islands of the northern Lesser Antilles to prepare for strong winds and rough seas. Due to its small size, only a few islands received significant effects from the hurricane. Saint-Barthélemy, Saba, Anguilla, Sint Eustatius, and Saint Kitts reported damage from the hurricane, totaling $623,500 (1955 USD, $4.7 million 2006 USD). Damage was heaviest on Saba and Anguilla, occurring primarily to shipping facilities and crops. 626 houses were destroyed or severely damaged on Anguilla, as well. The damage was caused mostly by heavy rainfall and rough seas, not the direct action of the wind. The passage of Hurricane Alice greatly troubled the economies of the small affected islands. Additionally, the outer rainbands of the storm alleviated dry conditions on Puerto Rico which had persisted since the previous October. No deaths were reported.

This storm formed on December 30; however, in the days before satellites, meteorologists had to rely on reports from ships and islands in the Atlantic to locate and track storms. This information was often sketchy; two cyclones, including a Category 2 hurricane, operationally went undetected in 1954. It was officially recognized as a significant tropical cyclone on January 2, 1955. At the time, the National Weather Service used the same naming list each year, so the name given to this storm was "Alice" and it was designated as a part of the 1955 Atlantic hurricane season. However, it was found during post-storm analysis that the storm had actually formed on December 30, and was instead a part of the 1954 season. Therefore, the season had two storms named "Alice" — the first storm of the season, and the last. Had Alice been discovered before the end of the calendar year, it would have been named Irene, the next name on the 1954 list. Some reports named this storm Alice2 to avoid confusion with the earlier Alice from June 1954.

Alice formed later in the calendar year than any Atlantic tropical cyclone on record, forming six hours later in the season than Tropical Storm Zeta in 2005. Alice was one of only eight Atlantic tropical cyclones to form in the month of December. Alice was the first of two Atlantic tropical cyclones to exist in two calendar years, the other being 2005's Zeta. The hurricane was also one of only six tropical or subtropical cyclones to exist in the month of January and the strongest to do so.

See also

 List of Category 1 Atlantic hurricanes
 List of off-season Atlantic hurricanes
 List of tropical cyclones

References

External links
 Monthly Weather Review: On The Formation Of Hurricane Alice, 1955
 1955 Monthly Weather Review

Alice2
1954 in the Caribbean
Alice 1954
Alice 1954
1954 meteorology
1955 meteorology
Alice 1954
Alice 1954
Alice 1954